Leandro Barreiro Martins (born 3 January 2000) is a Luxembourgish professional footballer who plays as a midfielder for Bundesliga club Mainz 05 and the Luxembourg national team.

Professional career
Born in Erpeldange, Luxembourg, Barreiro was a promising youth in the local FC Erpeldange 72 academy. He moved to the Racing FC Union Luxembourg Academy, from where he garnered attention throughout Europe, including from Paris Saint-Germain. He signed with Mainz in 2016.

On 4 November 2018, Barreiro signed his first professional contract with Mainz. He debuted with Mainz in a 5-1 Bundesliga loss to Bayer 04 Leverkusen on 8 February 2019.

International career
Barreiro was born in Luxembourg and is of Angolan descent. Barreiro made his international debut for the Luxembourg national football team in a 1–0 friendly win against Malta on 22 March 2018.

International goals
Scores and results list Luxembourg's goal tally first.

References

External links

 Profile at the 1. FSV Mainz 05 website 
 
 Leandro Barreiro at FuPa.net 
 

2000 births
Living people
People from Diekirch (canton)
Luxembourgian footballers
Luxembourg international footballers
Luxembourg youth international footballers
Luxembourgian people of Angolan descent
Association football midfielders
1. FSV Mainz 05 players
Bundesliga players
Luxembourgian expatriate footballers
Luxembourgian expatriate sportspeople in Germany
Expatriate footballers in Germany